Mohamed Chakouri (born 21 May 1986 in Arles, France) is an Algerian footballer who played as a defender for Charleroi S.C. in the Belgian First Division.

International career
On 17 August 2010 Chakouri was called up to the Algerian National Team for a 2012 African Cup of Nations qualifier against Tanzania.

References

External links
worldsoccerstats.com

Guardian Football

1986 births
Living people
Algerian footballers
French footballers
French sportspeople of Algerian descent
Montpellier HSC players
Ligue 2 players
R. Charleroi S.C. players
Association football defenders
French expatriate footballers
Expatriate footballers in Belgium
French expatriate sportspeople in Belgium
Algerian expatriate sportspeople in Belgium
Algerian expatriate footballers
Belgian Pro League players
People from Arles
France under-21 international footballers
France youth international footballers
Sportspeople from Bouches-du-Rhône
Footballers from Provence-Alpes-Côte d'Azur